The Kāpālika tradition was a Tantric, non-Puranic form of Shaivism which originated in Medieval India between the 7th and 8th century CE. The word is derived from the Sanskrit term kapāla, meaning "skull", and kāpālika means the "skull-men".

History

The Kāpālikas were an extinct sect of Shaivite ascetics devoted to the Hindu god Shiva dating back to the 8th century CE, which traditionally carried a skull-topped trident (khaṭvāṅga) and an empty human skull as a begging bowl. Other attributes associated with Kāpālikas were that they revered the fierce Bhairava form of Shiva by emulating his behavior and characteristics, smeared their body with ashes from the cremation grounds, wore their hair long and matted, and engaged in transgressive rituals such as sexual intercourse with lower-class women, human sacrifices, consumption of meat and alcoholic beverages, and offerings involving orgiastic sexuality and sexual fluids.

According to David Lorenzen, there is a paucity of primary sources on the Kāpālikas, and historical information about them is available from fictional works and other traditions who disparage them. Various Indian texts claim that the Kāpālikas drank liquor freely, both for ritual and as a matter of habit. The Chinese pilgrim to India in the 7th century CE, Hsuan Tsang, in his memoir on what is now Northwestern Pakistan, wrote about Buddhists living with naked ascetics who covered themselves with ashes and wore bone wreathes on their heads, but Hsuan Tsang does not call them Kāpālikas or any particular name. Historians of Indian religions and scholars of Hindu studies have interpreted these ascetics variously as Kāpālikas, Digambara Jains, and Pashupatas.

The Kāpālikas were more of a monastic order, states Lorenzen, and not a sect with a textual doctrine. The Kāpālika tradition gave rise to the Kulamārga, a subsect of Tantric Shaivism which preserves some of the distinctive features of the Kāpālika tradition. Some of the Kāpālika Shaiva practices are found in Vajrayana Buddhism, and scholars disagree on who influenced whom. Today, the Kāpālika tradition survives within its Shaivite offshoots: the Aghori order, Kaula, and Trika traditions.

Literature
Dyczkowski (1988: p. 26) holds that Hāla's Prakrit literature poem, the Gaha Sattasai, is one of the first extant literary references to an early Indian Kāpālika ascetic:

One of the earliest references to a Kāpālika is found in Hāla's Prakrit poem, the Gāthāsaptaśati (third to fifth century A.D.) in a verse in which the poet describes a young female Kāpālikā who besmears herself with ashes from the funeral pyre of her lover. Varāhamihira (c500-575) refer more than once to the Kāpālikas thus clearly establishing their existence in the sixth century. Indeed, from this time onwards references to Kāpālika ascetics become fairly commonplace in Sanskrit ...

See also
 Aghori
 Kashmir Shaivism
 Kaula
 Mahasiddha
 Mattavilasa Prahasana
 Pashupata Shaivism
 Vajrayana

References

Further reading
 Dictionary of Hindu Lore and Legend by Anna L. Dallapiccola (London : Thames & Hudson, 2002).
 Kapalikas and Kalamukhas: Two Lost Saivite Sects by David N. Lorenzen (Berkeley : University of California Press, 1972).
 Mattavilasaprahasana by Māni Mādhava Chākyār
 Ankalaparamecuvari : a goddess of Tamilnadu, her myths and cult by Eveline Meyer (Stuttgart : Steiner Verlag Wiesbaden GMBH, 1986)
 The Blackwell Companion to Hinduism. by Gavin Flood. 2003. Malden: Blackwell.
 Indian Esoteric Buddhism. by Ronald Davidson. 2002. Columbia University Press.

7th-century establishments in India
8th-century establishments in India
Hindu tantra
Shaiva sects
Vajrayana